Robert D. Young (March 7, 1934October 4, 2013) was a Republican member of both houses of the Michigan Legislature from 1971 through 1982.

After graduating from Michigan State University, Young returned to his farm in Saginaw. After one term each as Spaulding Township Supervisor and as a member of the Saginaw County Board of Commissioners, Young was elected to the Michigan House of Representatives in 1970, serving two terms. Young won election to the Michigan Senate in 1974, again serving two terms.

Redistricting after the 1980 Census put Young in the same Senate district—the 14th—as Senator Jerome T. Hart who defeated him for re-election in 1982. After he left the Legislature, Young became executive vice president of the Great Lakes Sugarbeet Growers Association, a role he held until his retirement in 1996.

Young was a Freemason and a member of the Shriners, Jaycees, and the Farm Bureau.

Young died on October 4, 2013, aged 79, from complications from an infection in the blood stream. He is buried in Oakwood Cemetery in Saginaw.

References

External links

|-

|-

1934 births
2013 deaths
American Freemasons
People from Saginaw County, Michigan
Michigan State University alumni
Farmers from Michigan
County commissioners in Michigan
Republican Party members of the Michigan House of Representatives
Republican Party Michigan state senators
20th-century American politicians